Ferdynandów may refer to the following places:
Ferdynandów, Poddębice County in Łódź Voivodeship (central Poland)
Ferdynandów, Radomsko County in Łódź Voivodeship (central Poland)
Ferdynandów, Lublin Voivodeship (east Poland)